The Freedom of Intellect Movement was a Bengal Renaissance movement advocating rationality against religious and social dogma in Bengali Muslim society. It was spearheaded by intellectuals in the University of Dhaka during the British Raj.

Notable members included Kazi Abdul Wadud, Abul Fazal, Muhammad Shahidullah, Qazi Motahar Hossain, Kazi Nazrul Islam and Abdul Quadir.

The movement also established the prestigious Muslim Literary Society in Dhaka.

References 

University of Dhaka
Bengal Renaissance